Stephan Schimandl (born 30 March 1999) is an Austrian footballer who plays for TSV Hartberg II.

Club career
On 21 August 2020, he signed with SV Horn.

On 7 July 2021, he moved to First Vienna on a one-year contract.

References

Living people
People from Mattersburg District
1999 births
Association football midfielders
Austrian footballers
SV Mattersburg players
SV Horn players
First Vienna FC players
Austrian Football Bundesliga players
2. Liga (Austria) players
Austrian Regionalliga players
Footballers from Burgenland